Kitahama may refer to:

Kitahama Station (disambiguation), multiple railway station in Japan
The Kitahama, a residential building in Chuo-ku, Osaka, Japan

People with the surname
, Japanese shogi player

Japanese-language surnames